Employee funds, sometimes referred to as Wage Earner funds, is a socialist version of sovereign wealth funds whereby the Swedish government taxed a proportion of company profits and put into special funds charged to buy shares in listed Swedish companies, with the goal of gradually transferring companies from private to collective employee ownership. The funds were controlled by representatives by Swedish trade unions.

History 
The idea was launched in the 1970s, with Rudolf Meidner playing a leading role in developing the idea, and they were in place from 1982 to 1991. Throughout their existence, they caused much political controversy. Proponents described them as an attempt to increase the power of labour over Swedish companies, and opponents described them as large step towards socialism.

They were introduced following the Social Democrat victory at the 1982 Swedish general election and accumulated funds until the 1991 Swedish general election, when the Social Democrats lost and so the effort was abolished. While the accumulated wealth was transferred to two holding vehicles named Atle and Bure. Both vehicles were subsequently listed on the Stockholm Stock Exchange. On October 4, 1983, an anti-employee funds demonstration in Stockholm gathered between 80,000 and 100,000 participants. It was the largest political protest - in terms of numbers mobilised - to take place in Sweden, from the liberal and right wing political block. 

Subsequent Social Democrat victories, such as the one in 1994, did not lead to their reintroduction, as leading members of the party found the whole debate surrounding the funds a problem for the party. Famously, Minister of Finance Kjell-Olof Feldt was captured on camera while he was writing a negative poem about the funds in his bench in Parliament after they had beem introduced.

During the 2020 United States presidential election, the candidate Bernie Sanders proposed for employee funds to be adopted in the United States.

References 

Economic history of Sweden
Politics of Sweden
1980s in Sweden
Ownership
Market socialism